Malaga railway station is a proposed bus and railway station for the Transperth network. It is set to start construction in 2021, and open in 2023–24 as a station on the Morley–Ellenbrook railway line, serving the Perth suburbs of Alexander Heights, Ballajura, Bennett Springs, Landsdale and Malaga.

Station design
The design for Malaga railway station was revealed on 4 September 2021. Metronet said that it was "designed to be a 'station within a park'", and that "it draws influence from the surrounding parklands in Whiteman Park, Lightning Park and the banksia bushlands."

The station's platforms are to be built in a trench below ground level, with the station entrance at ground level. A large car park and a bus interchange will be located south-east of the station. The car park will have 1,100 car bays and a drop off area. The bus interchange will have 12 bus stands. Facilities at the station include a kiosk, toilets and lifts to platform level.

The station will be constructed on a greenfield land between Beechboro Road North, Marshall Road and Tonkin Highway in the suburb of Whiteman, allowing for future development around the station.

Services
Malaga station will be served by Transperth Trains operating along the Morley–Ellenbrook railway line to Perth and Ellenbrook railway stations. It is projected that a journey to Perth will take 21 minutes. Malaga station is in fare zone 2. Malaga station is projected to have 3,084 passenger boardings per day in 2031.

References

External links
 Morley–Ellenbrook railway line on the Metronet website.

Morley–Ellenbrook line
Proposed railway stations in Perth, Western Australia
Malaga, Western Australia
Whiteman, Western Australia